Yang Fan (born 24 January 1995) is a Chinese football player. He plays for Chinese club Yuxi Yukun.

Club career
On 15 August 2017 Shanghai SIPG would loan Yang Fan to Japanese J3 League club Grulla Morioka for the remainder of the season. He would make his senior debut in a league game for the club on 26 November 2017 against Cerezo Osaka U-23 in a 3-2 defeat.

Career statistics
.

References

External links

1995 births
Living people
Chinese footballers
Footballers from Hunan
China League Two players
Chinese Super League players
J3 League players
Inner Mongolia Zhongyou F.C. players
Shanghai Port F.C. players
Iwate Grulla Morioka players
Suzhou Dongwu F.C. players
Chinese expatriate footballers
Expatriate footballers in Japan
Chinese expatriate sportspeople in Japan
Association football defenders
21st-century Chinese people